The C&C 43-1 is a Canadian sailboat, that was designed by Cuthbertson & Cassian (C&C Design) and first built in 1971.

The design was originally marketed as the C&C 43, but is now usually referred to as the 43-1 to differentiate it from the unrelated 1980 C&C 43-2.

Production
The design was built by C&C Yachts in Canada who completed 15 examples, starting in 1971, but it is now out of production. The boats were built by C&C's Bruckmann Yachts division, which constructed the custom and semi-custom C&C boats.

Design
The C&C 43-1 is a small recreational keelboat, built predominantly of fibreglass, with wood trim. It has a masthead sloop rig, a raked stem, a raised reverse transom, an internally-mounted spade-type rudder controlled by a wheel and a fixed swept fin keel. It displaces  and carries  of lead ballast.

The boat is fitted with an inboard engine for docking and maneuvering.

A  taller mast was a factory option. This also increased total sail area by about 2%.

The Tall mast version has a PHRF racing average handicap of 78 with a high of 89 and low of 66.

See also
List of sailing boat types

Related development
C&C 43-2

Similar sailboats
Hunter 43 Legend
Hunter 420
Hunter 426
Hunter 430

References

Keelboats
1970s sailboat type designs
Sailing yachts
Sailboat type designs by C&C Design
Sailboat types built by C&C Yachts